Karachi Cantonment Railway Station (Sindhi: ڪراچي ڇانوڻي ريلوي اسٽيشن) (often abbreviated as Karachi Cantt.) is one of the busiest and principal railway stations in Karachi, Sindh, Pakistan. It is situated near Dr. Daudpota Road, Saddar.

History
It was earlier known as Frere Street Station. Construction of the station began in 1896 and was completed in 1898 at a total cost of Rs. 80,000. The present building of Karachi Cantt station has been declared a protected heritage site by the Government of Sindh.

Facilities 
Karachi Cantonment Station is equipped with all basic facilities. The station has current and advance reservation offices for Pakistan Railways as well as cargo and parcel facilities. Retail shops are found on platform 1, including restaurants such as Rehmat-e-Shereen and Pizza Hut.

Services
The following trains originate/stop at Karachi Cantonment station:

Gallery

See also 

 Karachi
 List of railway stations in Pakistan
 Karachi City Station
 Landhi Railway Station
 Drigh Road Railway Station
 Pakistan Railways
 Karachi Circular Railway

References

External links 

Karachi, Gateway To Pakistan on Karachi Municipal Corporation (KMC) website (scroll down to read the title 'Transport Rail')

Railway stations in Karachi
Railway stations opened in 1898
Railway stations on Karachi Circular Railway
Railway stations on Karachi–Peshawar Line (ML 1)
Heritage sites in Karachi